Sherif Medhat (born January 20, 1988) is an Egyptian professional footballer who plays as a goalkeeper for Alassiouty Sport. In 2014, Medhat joined Alassiouty from Asyut Petrolum, and he signed a 3-year contract for the club in 2016.

References

External links
 Sherif Medhat at KOOORA.com

1988 births
Living people
Egyptian footballers
Association football goalkeepers
Asyut Petroleum SC players
Pyramids FC players